ZeniMax Halifax Ltd. (trade name: Alpha Dog Games) is a mobile video game developer based in Nova Scotia, Canada that develops mobile games for the iOS and Android platforms. The company was acquired by ZeniMax Media in October 2019. 

ZeniMax Media was acquired by Microsoft in March 2021 and became part of Xbox Game Studios. As a result, Alpha Dog Games has been owned by Microsoft since 2021, and it is an indirect mobile gaming extension of the Xbox brand.

Games developed

References 

2019 mergers and acquisitions
Video game companies of Canada